Sant'Andrea is a small island in the Venetian Lagoon, northern Italy.

References

Sant'Andrea